Hyco Lake is a reservoir in Person and Caswell counties, North Carolina. It is the area's main destination for fishing, boating, water skiing, wake boarding, and recreation and is the larger of Person County's two lakes, the other being Mayo Lake. The lake was formed from the Hyco River and has three main tributaries; North Hyco Creek, South Hyco Creek, and Cobbs Creek. Interest in the lake for vacation homes has created numerous homes along its shores with relatively high property values. Over 1500 homes have been constructed around the lake with approximately 800 occupied year-round. It runs through the following municipalities: Semora, Leasburg, and the city of Roxboro located about ten miles (16 km) from the lake.

Hyco Lake was constructed in the early 1960s by Carolina Power and Light Company (now Duke Energy Progress) as a cooling reservoir for their power generating plant. Since its establishment, the lake and its recreation park have been under the jurisdiction of the Person-Caswell Lake Authority. The water is regulated by the North Carolina Department of Environment and Natural Resources. Hurricane Hilda elevated Hyco Lake's water level.

The name Hyco is derived from "Hicotaminy" which is what the native Indians called the area due to the number of turkey buzzards which were and still are in the area.  Hicotaminy means "great turkey buzzard".

External links
 Hyco Lake Website
 Roxboro and Person County Hyco Lake page

Reservoirs in North Carolina
Protected areas of Caswell County, North Carolina
Protected areas of Person County, North Carolina
Rivers of Caswell County, North Carolina
Rivers of Person County, North Carolina